Eyoh is a surname. Notable people with the surname include:

Effiong Eyoh (born 1996), Nigerian footballer
Ndumbe Eyoh (1949–2006), Cameroonian theatre director, critic, and playwright

See also
Eyob

Surnames of African origin